is an anime cartoon series and a sequel to The Adventures of Hutch the Honeybee.

Plot 
The sequel starts some time after the events of the first series, as Hutch and his sister, Aya, lose their mother, the Queen Bee, after an attack of the Wasps which destroys their Kingdom. Together, they embark on a long and dangerous journey to find a place called the Beautiful Hill, on which they would rebuild their kingdom, and Aya would become the Queen. Tenten, a ladybug, befriends Hutch and Aya and joins them on their journey, as he searches for his missing father. At the same time they have to confront Apachi, a wasp who seeks revenge against Hutch, believing that he killed his father. At the end of the series, Hutch finally finds his mother, and the story ends with a happy ending.

Cast
Hutch: Yoko Kuri
Queen Mama: Haruko Kitahama
Aya: Yoshiko Yamamoto
Tenten: Junko Mori
Taro Ama: Eken Minu
Apachi: Yuko Maruyama
Narrator: Toshiko Sawada

Episodes

References

External links
 

1974 anime television series debuts
Japanese children's animated adventure television series
Adventure anime and manga
Tatsunoko Production
TV Asahi original programming
Animated television series about insects
Animated television series about orphans

it:Ape Magà
ja:昆虫物語 みなしごハッチ
pl:Hutch Miodowe Serce